Longona lotzi is a species of jumping spider in the genus Langona that lives in South Africa. It was first described by Charles R. Haddad and Wanda Wesołowska in 2011.

References

Endemic fauna of South Africa
Salticidae
Spiders of South Africa
Spiders described in 2011
Taxa named by Wanda Wesołowska